Please add names of notable painters with a Wikipedia page, in precise English alphabetical order, using U.S. spelling conventions. Country and regional names refer to where painters worked for long periods, not to personal allegiances.

Dirck van Baburen (1595–1624), Dutch painter
Jacopo Baccarini (1605–1682), Italian painter
Johanna Juliana Friederike Bacciarelli (1733–1809 or later), German miniaturist and court painter
Marcello Bacciarelli (1731–1818), Italian/Polish painter
Irene Bache (1901–1999), English/Welsh painter
Augustin Meinrad Bächtiger (1888–1971), Swiss painter
Jacob Adriaensz Backer (1609–1651), Dutch painter
Margaret Backhouse (1818–1888), English portrait painter
Francis Bacon (1909–1992), Irish-born English painter
Lucy Angeline Bacon (1857–1932), American painter
Marjorie May Bacon (1902–1988), English painter and print-maker
Peggy Bacon (1895–1987), American print-maker and painter
Joseph Badger (ca. 1707–1765), American portrait painter
Ottó Baditz (1849–1936), Hungarian painter
Jan de Baen (1633–1702), Dutch portrait painter
Jo Baer (born 1929), American minimalist painter
William Jacob Baer (1860–1941), American miniature painter
Stanley Bahe, Navajo American painter
Leonard Bahr (1905–1990), American painter, muralist and illustrator
Edward Bailey (1814–1903), American/Hawaiian landscape painter
Alice Bailly (1872–1938), Swiss painter
David Bailly (1584–1657), Dutch painter
George Bain (1881–1968), Scottish artist and art teacher
Robert Bain (1911–1973), Scottish/South African sculptor and art professor
Thomas Baines (1820–1875), English painter and explorer
Baiōken Eishun (梅翁軒永春, fl. 1710–1755), Japanese painter and print-maker
Edward Baird (1904–1949), Scottish painter and draftsman
Kōno Bairei (幸野楳嶺, 1844–1895), Japanese painter and illustrator
Enrico Baj (1924–2003), Italian artist and writer on art
James Ballantine (1806–1877), Scottish glass painter and poet
Barbara Balmer (1929–2017), Scottish artist and art teacher
Mario Bardi (1922–1998), Italian realist painter
George Herbert Baker (1878–1943), American impressionist painter
Normand Baker (1908–1955), Australian portrait painter
William Bliss Baker (1859–1886), American painter
Ludolf Bakhuizen (1631–1708), Dutch marine painter
Léon Bakst (1866–1924), Russian/American painter and stage designer
Alesso Baldovinetti (1427–1499), Italian painter
Hans Baldung (1484–1545), German painter and print-maker
Hendrick van Balen (1575–1632), Flemish painter and stained-glass designer
Endre Bálint (1914–1986), Hungarian painter and graphic artist
Rezső Bálint (1885–1945), Hungarian painter
Pál Balkay (1785–1846), Hungarian painter and teacher
Giacomo Balla (1871–1958), Italian painter and poet
Robert Ballagh (born 1943), Irish painter and designer
Karl Ballmer (1891–1958), Swiss painter and philosopher
Barbara Balmer (1929–2017), Scottish painter and teacher
János Nagy Balogh (1874–1919), Hungarian painter 
László Balogh (born 1930), Hungarian painter
Balthus (1908–2001), Polish/French artist
Ernő Bánk (1883–1962), Hungarian painter, miniaturist and teacher
Edward Mitchell Bannister (1828–1901), Canadian/American tonalist painter
Bapu (born 1933), Indian painter and film director
Miklós Barabás (1810–1898), Hungarian painter 
Vladimir Baranov-Rossine (1888–1944), Russian/French avant-garde artist
Jacopo de' Barbari (c. 1460/1470 – before 1516), Italian painter and print-maker
Giovanni Francesco Barbieri (Guercino) (1591–1666), Italian painter and draftsman
Jenő Barcsay (1900–1988), Hungarian painter
James Bard (1815–1897), American watercraft painter
Magdalene Bärens (1737–1808), Danish artist
George Barker (1882–1965), American portrait and landscape artist
Lucette Barker (1816–1905), English painter
Thomas Barker (1769–1847), Welsh/English painter
John Noble Barlow (1861–1917), English painter
Gwen Barnard (1912–1988), English painter and print-maker
Ernie Barnes (born 1938), American artist and author
Robert C. Barnfield (1856–1893), English/American painter
Henri Alphonse Barnoin (1882–1940), French painter
Federico Barocci (1535–1612) Italian painter and print-maker
Aimé Barraud (1902–1954), Swiss painter
François Barraud (1899–1934), Swiss painter
George Barret, Sr. (c. 1730 – 1784), Irish landscape painter
George Barret, Jr. (1767–1842), English landscape painter (son of George Barret, Sr.)
Syd Barrett (1946–2006), English painter and musician
Mardi Barrie (1930–2004), Scottish painter and art teacher
James Barry (1741–1806), Irish painter
Hans von Bartels (1856–1913), German painter
Richmond Barthé (1901 – c. 1990), American sculptor
Lindsay Bartholomew (born 1944), English watercolor painter
Charles W. Bartlett (1860–1940), English/Hawaiian painter and print-maker
Jennifer Bartlett (born 1941), American artist
Fra Bartolomeo (1474–1517), Italian religious painter
Francesco Bartolozzi (1728–1815) Italian/English engraver
Rose Maynard Barton (1856–1929), Irish/English painter
Andor Basch (1885–1944), Hungarian painter
Gyula Basch (1859–1928), Hungarian painter
Evaristo Baschenis (1617–1677), Italian still-life painter
Georg Baselitz (born 1938), German painter, sculptor and graphic artist
Marie Bashkirtseff (1860–1884), Russian/French painter, sculptor and diarist
Franz Karl Basler-Kopp (1879–1937), German/Swiss painter
Jean-Michel Basquiat (1960–1988), American graffiti artist, painter and musician
Jacopo Bassano (c. 1510 – 1592), Italian religious and genre painter
Bartholomeus van Bassen (1590–1652), Dutch painter and architect
James Bateman (1893–1959), English pastoral painter and engraver
Robert Bateman (1842–1922), English painter and horticulturalist
Robert Bateman (born 1930), Canadian painter and naturalist
Cafer Bater (1913–1994), Turkish water-color painter
Maxwell Bates (1906–1980), Canadian expressionist painter and architect
Pompeo Batoni (1708–1787), Italian painter
John Nelson Battenberg (born 1931), American sculptor
Gyula Batthyány (1887–1959), Hungarian painter and graphic artist
André Bauchant (1873–1958), French naïve painter
Auguste Baud-Bovy (1848–1949), Swiss rural painter
Lubin Baugin (c. 1611 – 1663), French still-life painter
Edgar Schofield Baum (1916–2006), American painter, sculptor and poet
Walter Emerson Baum (1884–1956), American artist and educator
Fritz Baumann (1886–1942), Swiss painter
Tilo Baumgärtel (born 1972), German painter
Armin Baumgarten (born 1967), German painter and sculptor
Walter Bayes (1869–1956), English painter and illustrator
Wyke Bayliss (1835–1906), English painter, author and poet
James Baynes (1766–1837), English water-color painter and draftsman
Thomas Mann Baynes (1794–1854), English artist and lithographer
Frédéric Bazille (1841–1870), French painter
Reynolds Beal (1867–1951), American painter and etcher
Sophia Beale (1837–1920), English painter and writer on art
Romare Bearden (1914–1988), American artist and songwriter
Penelope Beaton (1886–1963), Scottish water-colorist
Robert Beauchamp (1923–1995), American painter and arts educator
André Beauneveu (1335–1400), Netherlandish sculptor and painter
Cecilia Beaux (1855–1942), American portrait painter
Domenico di Pace Beccafumi (1486–1551), Italian painter
Robert Bechtle (born 1932), American painter
Jasmine Becket-Griffith, American artist on acrylic, canvas and wood
Clarice Beckett (1887–1935), Australian artist
Max Beckmann (1884–1950), German painter, print-maker and sculptor
Celia Frances Bedford (1904–1959), English portrait painter
Ignat Bednarik (1882–1963), Romanian painter and illustrator
Vanessa Beecroft (born 1969) Italian/American sculptor, painter and performance artist
Tuvia Beeri (born 1929) Czech/Israeli painter
Cornelis Pietersz Bega (1620–1664), Dutch painter and engraver
Abraham Begeyn (1637–1697), Dutch painter
Kamāl ud-Dīn Behzād (born 1450), Persian painter
Abraham van Beijeren (1620–1690), Dutch painter
Zdzisław Beksiński (1929–2005), Polish painter, photographer and sculptor
Andrew Bell (1726–1809), Scottish engraver and printer
George Bell (1878–1966), Australian painter, teacher and violinist
Gladys Kathleen Bell (1882–1965), English artist and miniature painter
John Zephaniah Bell (1794–1883), Scottish/English artist
Leland Bell (1922–1991), American painter
Vanessa Bell (1879–1961), English painter and interior designer
John Bellany (1942–2013), Scottish painter
Alexis Simon Belle (1674–1734), French portrait painter
Henri Bellechose (died before 1445), Netherlandish painter
Giovanni Bellini (c. 1430 – 1516), Italian painter
Gentile Bellini (c. 1429 – 1507), Italian painter
Jacopo Bellini (c. 1400 – 1470), Italian painter
Bernardo Bellotto (1721–1780), Italian landscape painter
George Bellows (1882–1925), American realist painter
Ludwig Bemelmans (1898–1962), Austrian/American children's illustrator and writer
Gyula Benczúr (1844–1920), Hungarian painter and instructor
Marilyn Bendell (1921–2003), American painter
Wilhelm Bendz (1804–1832), Danish painter
Manfredi Beninati (born 1970), Italian artist and sculptor
Jason Benjamin (born 1971), Australian painter
Martin Benka (1888–1977), Hungarian/Slovak painter
Frank Weston Benson (1862–1951), American painter and etcher
Thomas Hart Benton (1889–1975), American painter and muralist
Alexandre Benois (1870–1960), Russian/Soviet/French artist and art critic
Lajos Berán (1882–1943), Hungarian sculptor and medalist
Jean Béraud (1849–1935), French painter
Nicolaes Pieterszoon Berchem (1620–1683), Dutch painter
Gerrit Adriaenszoon Berckheyde (1638–1698), Dutch painter
Róbert Berény (1887–1953), Hungarian painter
Marcelle Bergerol (1900–1989), French painter
Christoffel van den Berghe (1590–1645), Flemish/Dutch painter
Carlos Berlanga (1959–2002), Spanish painter, musician and composer
Hans Eduard von Berlepsch-Valendas (1849–1921), Swiss/German painter, architect and designer
Helen Berman (born 1936) Dutch/Israeli painter and textile designer
Émile Bernard (1868–1941), French painter and writer
Aurél Bernáth (1895–1982), Hungarian painter
John E. Berninger (1896–1981), American painter
Gian Lorenzo Bernini (1598–1680), Italian sculptor and architect
Morris Louis Bernstein (1912–1962), American painter
William Berra (born 1952), American painter
Albert Bertelsen (1921–2019), Danish painter and graphic artist
Johann Berthelsen (1883–1972), American painter
Robert Bery (born 1953), American painter, photographer and sculptor
Elsa Beskow (1874–1953), Swedish children's illustrator and writer
Paul-Albert Besnard (1849–1934), French painter and print-maker
Eleanor Best (1875–1958), English painter
László Beszédes (1874–1922), Hungarian sculptor
Joseph Beuys (1921–1986), German painter and performance artist
Robert Bevan (1865–1925), English painter, draftsman and lithographer
Henryka Beyer (1782–1855), German/Polish painter
Riad Beyrouti (born 1944), Syrian/French painter
Lujo Bezeredi (1898–1979), Hungarian/Croatian sculptor and painter
Roman Bezpalkiv (1938–2009), Soviet/Ukrainian painter
Bholekar Srihari (born 1941), Indian painter, sculptor and print-maker
Bian Jingzhao (邊景昭, fl. 1426–1435), Chinese painter
Bian Shoumin (边寿民, 1684–1752), Chinese painter
Alessandro Galli Bibiena (1687–1769), Italian architect and painter
Antonio Galli Bibiena (1700–1774), Italian architect and painter
Carlo Galli Bibiena (1728–1787), Italian designer and painter
Maria Oriana Galli Bibiena (1656–1749), Italian painter
Heinrich Bichler (1466–1497), Swiss painter
George Biddle (1885–1973), American painter, muralist and lithographer
Candido Bido (1936–2011), Dominican Republic painter
Johann Jakob Biedermann (1763–1830), Swiss painter and etcher
André Charles Biéler (1896–1989), Swiss/Canadian painter and teacher
Ernest Biéler (1863–1948), Swiss painter, draftsman and print-maker
Adolf Bierbrauer (1915–2012), German conceptual artist, painter and sculptor
Albert Bierstadt (1830–1902), American painter
Helen Biggar (1909–1953), Scottish sculptor and film-maker
Sándor Bihari (1855–1906), Hungarian painter
Jan van Bijlert (1597–1671), Dutch painter
Ivan Bilibin (1876–1942), Russian/Soviet illustrator and stage designer
Edmond Bille (1878–1959), Swiss painter, stained-glass artist and writer
Ejler Bille (1910–2004), Danish artist
Charles Billich (born 1934), Yugoslav/Croatian artist
George Caleb Bingham (1811–1879), American artist and politician
Margaret Bingham (1740–1814), English painter, copyist and poet
Helen Binyon (1904–1979), English painter, illustrator and puppeteer
S J "Lamorna" Birch (1869–1955), English painter
Paul Bird (1923–1993), English artist and teacher
Oswald Birley (1880–1952), English painter and portraitist
Peter Birmann (1758–1844), Swiss painter
Samuel Birmann (1793–1847), Swiss painter
Thierry Bisch (born 1953), French artist
Elmer Bischoff (1916–1991), American visual artist
Tim Biskup (born 1967), American artist
Giuseppe Bernardino Bison (1762–1844) Italian fresco and religious painter
Vilhelm Bissen (1836–1913), Danish sculptor
Douglas Robertson Bisset (1908–2000), Scottish sculptor
Cornelis Bisschop (1630–1674), Dutch painter
Emil Bisttram (1895–1976), American artist
Henri Biva (1848–1929), French painter
Mary Black (c. 1737 – 1814), English portrait painter
Sam Black (1913–1997), Scottish artist
Jemima Blackburn (1823–1909), Scottish painter and illustrator
Ann Thetis Blacker (1927–2006), English painter and singer
Vivien Blackett (born 1955), English artist
Charles Blackman (born 1928), Australian painter
Basil Blackshaw (born 1932), Northern Irish artist
Doris Blair (born 1915), Northern Irish artist
John Blair (painter) (1849–1934), Scottish painter
William Blake (1757–1827), painter, poet and print-maker
Zelma Blakely (1921–1978), English painter and print-maker
Ralph Albert Blakelock (1847–1919), American painter
Edmund Blampied (1886–1966), Jersey/English artist and etcher
Arnold Blanch (1896–1968), American painter, etcher and lithographer
Jacques Blanchard (1600–1638), French painter
Ross Bleckner (born 1949), American painter
Johann Heinrich Bleuler (1758–1823), Swiss painter and porcelain designer
Johann Ludwig Bleuler (1792–1850), Swiss landscape painter and publisher
Carl Heinrich Bloch (1834–1890), Danish painter
Anna Katharina Block (1642–1719), German painter
Benjamin Block (1631–1690), German painter
Josef Block (1863–1943), German painter
Abraham Bloemaert (1566–1651), Dutch painter, print-maker and engraver
Hendrick Bloemaert (1601–1672), Dutch painter
Flavia Blois (1914–1980), English landscape painter
Tina Blondell (born 1953), Austrian/American painter
Hyman Bloom (1913–2009), Latvian/American painter
Pieter de Bloot (1601–1658), Dutch painter
Godfrey Blow (born 1948), Australian Stuckist artist
Peter Blume (1906–1992), American painter and sculptor
Ditlev Blunck (1798–1854), Danish/German painter
Robert Henderson Blyth (1919–1970), Scottish painter
David Gilmour Blythe (1815–1865), American painter and poet
Umberto Boccioni (1882–1916), Italian painter and sculptor
Anna Boch (1848–1936), Belgian painter
François Bocion (1828–1890), Swiss painter, designer and art professor
Thomas Bock (1793–1855), English/Australian artist and photographer
Arnold Böcklin (1827–1901), Swiss symbolist painter
Margaret Boden (1912–2001), Scottish painter and illustrator
Karl Bodmer (1809–1893), Swiss/French print-maker, etcher and lithographer
Paul Bodmer (1886–1983), Swiss painter
Zsolt Bodoni (born 1975), Romanian (Hungarian) painter
Edward Marshall Boehm (1913–1969), American sculptor and porcelain maker
George Bogart (1933–2005), American painter
Krzysztof Boguszewski (1906–1988), Polish painter
Pál Böhm (1839–1905), Hungarian/German painter
Aaron Bohrod (1907–1992), American painter
Louis-Léopold Boilly (1761–1845), French painter and draftsman
Maurice Boitel (born 1919), French painter
Ferdinand Bol (1616–1680), Dutch painter, etcher and draftsman
Hans Bol (1534–1593), Flemish painter, miniaturist and draftsman
Kees Bol (1916–2009), Dutch painter and art educator
Giovanni Boldini (1842–1931), Italian/French painter
Boetius Adamsz Bolswert (1585–1633), German Frisian/Dutch copperplate engraver
Schelte a Bolswert (1586–1659), Dutch engraver
Irvin Bomb (born 1967), American painter, illustrator and film-maker
David Bomberg (1890–1957), English painter
Camille Bombois (1883–1970), French naïve painter
Muirhead Bone (1876–1953), Scottish etcher and water-colorist
Phyllis Bone (1894–1972), Scottish sculptor
Stephen Bone (1904–1958), English painter and broadcaster
Isidore Bonheur (1827–1901), French sculptor
Rosa Bonheur (1822–1899), French painter and sculptor
Hugo Sánchez Bonilla (born 1940), Costa Rican artist
Claude Bonin-Pissarro (born 1921), French painter and graphic designer
Richard Parkes Bonington (1802–1828), English/French landscape painter
William Bonnar (1800–1863), Scottish painter and draftsman
Pierre Bonnard (1867–1947), French painter, illustrator and print-maker
Francesco Bonsignori (1460–1519), Italian painter and draftsman
Gerard ter Borch (1617–1681), Dutch genre painter
Paul-Émile Borduas (1905–1960), Canadian abstract painter
Adolf Born (born 1930) Czechoslovak/Czech painter, illustrator and caricaturist
Vladimir Borovikovsky (1757–1825), Russian portrait painter
József Borsos (1821–1883), Hungarian portrait painter and photographer
Miklós Borsos (1906–1990), Hungarian sculptor
Sándor Bortnyik (1893–1976), Hungarian painter and graphic designer
Samu Börtsök (1881–1931), Hungarian painter
Kameda Bōsai (亀田鵬斎, 1752–1826), Japanese nanga painter
Hieronymus Bosch (c. 1450 – 1516), Dutch/Netherlandish painter
Abraham Bosschaert (1612–1643), Dutch painter
Ambrosius Bosschaert (1573–1621), Dutch still-life painter
Ambrosius Bosschaert II (1609–1645), Dutch flower painter
Johannes Bosschaert (1610–1650), Dutch still-life painter
Ángel Botello (1913–1986), Spanish/Puerto Rican painter, sculptor and graphic artist
Fernando Botero (born 1932), Colombian artist and sculptor
Andries Both (1612–1641), Dutch genre painter
Jan Dirksz Both (1610–1652), Dutch painter, draftsman and etcher
Sandro Botticelli (1445–1510), Italian painter
François Boucher (1703–1770), French painter, draftsman and etcher
Eugène Boudin (1824–1898), French landscape painter
William-Adolphe Bouguereau (1825–1905), French academic painter
Jack Boul (born 1917), American painter
Gustave Boulanger (1824–1888), French figure painter
Doris Boulton-Maude (1892–1961), English engraver, etcher and print-maker
Douglas Bourgeois (born 1951), American figurative painter 
Francis Bourgeois (1753–1811), English landscape and history painter
John Bourne (born 1943), English/Welsh artist and Stuckist painter
Esaias Boursse (1631–1672), Dutch genre painter
Dieric Bouts (1420–1475), Netherlandish painter
Camille Bouvagne (1864–1936), French painter
Carol Bove (born 1971), American artist
Erwin Bowien (1899-1972), German painter
Eden Box (1919–1988), English painter
Zlatyu Boyadzhiev (1903–1976), Bulgarian painter
Arthur Boyd (1920–1999), Australian painter
Arthur Merric Boyd (1862–1940), Australian painter
David Boyd (born 1924), Australian artist
Mary Syme Boyd (1910–1997), Scottish painter and sculptor
Penleigh Boyd (1890–1923), Australian artist
Jimmy Boyle (born 1944), Scottish sculptor and novelist
Mark Boyle (1934–2005), Scottish painter and sculptor
Olga Boznańska (1865–1940), Polish painter
Dorothea Braby (1909–1987), English artist and illustrator
John Brack (1920–1999), Australian painter
Robert Brackman (1898–1980), American artist and teacher
Marie Bracquemond (1841–1916), French impressionist painter
Dorothy Bradford (1918–2008), English painter and print-maker
Dorothy Elizabeth Bradford (1897–1986), English painter
Leonaert Bramer (1596–1674), Dutch religious and history painter
Christian Hilfgott Brand (1694–1756), German landscape painter
Johann Christian Brand (1722–1795), Austrian painter
Peter Brandes (born 1944), Danish painter, sculptor and ceramicist
Petr Brandl (1668–1739), Bohemian painter
Warren Eugene Brandon (1916–1977), American painter and photographer
Eugène Brands (1913–2002), Dutch painter
Józef Brandt (1841–1915), Polish painter
Muriel Brandt (1909–1981), Irish painter
Ruth Brandt (1936–1989), Irish artist and teacher
Georges Braque (1882–1963), French painter, print-maker and sculptor
Arnold Franz Brasz (1888–1966), American painter, sculptor and print-maker
Maurice Braun (1877–1941), American landscape painter
Victor Brauner (1903–1966), Romanian sculptor and surrealist painter
Robert J. Brawley (1936–2006), American painter
Jan de Bray (1627–1697), Dutch painter
Dirck de Bray (c. 1635 – 1694), Dutch painter
Phyllis Bray (1911–1991), English mural painter
Salomon de Bray (1597–1664), Dutch painter and architect
Carl Frederik von Breda (1759–1818), Swedish painter
Bartholomeus Breenbergh (1598–1657), Dutch painter of Italian landscapes
George Hendrik Breitner (1857–1923), Dutch painter and photographer
Quirijn van Brekelenkam (1622–1670), Dutch genre painter
Mark A. Brennan (born 1968), Canadian landscape painter
Art Brenner (1924–2013), American abstract sculptor and painter
Louise Catherine Breslau (1856–1927), Swiss/French painter and print-maker
Jules Breton (1827–1906), French naturalist painter
David Brewster (born 1960), American painter
James E. Brewton (1930–1967), American painter and print-maker
Breyten Breytenbach (born 1939), South African writer and painter
Gabor Breznay (born 1956), Hungarian/French painter
József Breznay (1916–2012), Hungarian painter
Alfred Thompson Bricher (1837–1908), American painter
Ernest Briggs (1923–1984), American painter
Henry Bright (1810–1873), English painter
Pierre Brissaud (1885–1964), French illustrator, painter and engraver
Károly Brocky (1808–1855), Hungarian/English painter
Louis le Brocquy (1916–2012), Irish painter
Heinrich Brocksieper (1898–1968), German photographer, painter and film-maker
William Brodie (1815–1881), Scottish sculptor
Antoni Brodowski (1784–1832), Polish painter
Sándor Brodszky (1819–1901), Hungarian painter
Melchior Broederlam (1350 – post-1409), Netherlandish painter
Arnold Bronckhorst (fl. 1565–1583), Dutch painter, first King's Painter of Scotland
Agnolo Bronzino (1503–1572), Italian mannerist painter
Alexander Brook (1898–1980), American artist and art critic
Peter Brook (1927–2009), English painter
Bertram Brooker (1888–1955), Canadian painter
Allan Brooks (1869–1946), Canadian bird artist and ornithologist
Frank Leonard Brooks (born 1911), Canadian artist
James Brooks (1906–1992), American muralist and painter
Romaine Brooks (1874–1970), American portrait painter
Robert Brough (1872–1905), Scottish painter
Adriaen Brouwer (1605–1638), Flemish painter
Cecily Brown (born 1969), English/American painter
Ford Madox Brown (1821–1893), English painter
John Brown (c. 1752 – 1787), Scottish artist and draftsman
John Crawford Brown (1805–1867), Scottish landscape painter
Lucy Madox Brown (1843–1894), English artist, author and model
Francis Focer Brown (1891–1971), American painter
Joan Brown (1938–1990), American figurative painter
Judith Brown (1931–1992), American sculptor and dancer
Nyuju Stumpy Brown (1924–2011), Australian painter and cultural figure
Kathleen Browne (1905–2007), New Zealand painter
Mia Brownell (born 1971), American painter
Václav Brožík (1851–1901), Czech/French painter
Patrick Henry Bruce (1881–1936), American painter
Lajos Bruck (1846–1910), Hungarian painter
Lodewijk Bruckman (1903–1995), Dutch magic realist painter
Jan Brueghel the Elder (1568–1625), Flemish painter and draftsman
Jan Brueghel the Younger (1601–1678), Flemish painter
Pieter Bruegel the Elder (c. 1525 – 1569), Dutch painter and print-maker
Pieter Brueghel the Younger (1564–1638), Flemish painter
Marjorie Frances Bruford (1902–1958), English painter
Arnold Brügger (1888–1975), Swiss painter
Élisabeth Vigée Le Brun (1755–1842), French painter
Elizabeth York Brunton (1880 – c. 1960), Scottish painter and woodcut artist
Barthel Bruyn the Elder (1493–1555), Germain painter
Barthel Bruyn the Younger (c. 1530 – 1607/1610), German painter
Robert Bryden (1865–1939), Scottish painter, engraver and sculptor
Karl Bryullov (1799–1852), Russian painter
Tadeusz Brzozowski (1818–1887), Polish painter
Ernest Buckmaster (1897–1968), Australian artist
Ota Bubeníček (1871–1962), Czech landscape painter
Emanuel Büchel (1705–1775), Swiss painter
Frank Buchser (1828–1890), Swiss painter
David Budd (1927–1991), American painter
Karl Buesgen (1917–1981), American landscape painter
Bernard Buffet (1928–1999), French expressionist painter
Vlaho Bukovac (1855–1922), Austro-Hungarian/Yugoslav/Croatian painter
Norma Bull (1906–1980), Australian painter and print-maker
Johann Balthasar Bullinger (1713–1793), Swiss landscape painter
Fritz Bultman (1919–1985), American painter, sculptor and collagist
John Elwood Bundy (1853–1933), American painter
Dennis Miller Bunker (1861–1890), American painter
Charles Ragland Bunnell (1897–1968), American painter, print-maker and muralist
Rupert Bunny (1864–1947), Australian painter
Mykola Burachek (1871–1942), Russian/Soviet painter and pedagogue
Elbridge Ayer Burbank (1858–1949), American portrait painter
Charles E. Burchfield (1893–1967), American painter and visionary artist
Jacob Burck (1907–1982), Polish/American painter, sculptor and cartoonist
Hans Burgkmair (1473–1531), German painter and print-maker
Francisco de Burgos Mantilla (1612–1672), Spanish painter
Max Buri (1868–1915), Swiss painter
Zdeněk Burian (1905–1981), Moravian/Czechoslovak painter
Rodney Joseph Burn (1899–1984), English painter
Eugène Burnand (1850–1921), Swiss painter and illustrator
Thomas Stuart Burnett (1853–1888), Scottish sculptor
Dorothy Burroughes (1883–1963), English painter, illustrator and lino-cut artist
Alberto Burri (1915–1995) Italian painter, sculptor and physician
David Burton-Richardson (born 1961), Welsh artist and poet
Sergio Burzi (1901–1954), Italian painter and illustrator
Mildred Anne Butler (1858–1941), Irish painter
Theodore Earl Butler (1861–1936), American painter
Ambreen Butt (born 1969), Pakistani/American painter, draftsman and collagist
Howard Butterworth (living), Scottish painter
John Button (1930–1982), American artist
Louis Buvelot (1814–1888), Swiss/Australian painter
Willem Pieterszoon Buytewech (1591–1624), Dutch painter, draftsman and etcher
Byeon Sang-byeok (변상벽, fl. mid-18th c.), Korean painter
Mary Byfield (1795–1871), English book illustrator and wood engraver
John Byrne (1786–1847), English painter and engraver
John Byrne (born 1940), Scottish painter and playwright
Johann Rudolf Byss (1660–1738), Swiss painter

References
References can be found under each entry.

B